Pickens County is a county located in the north-central portion of the U.S. state of Georgia. As of the 2020 census, the population was 33,216. The county seat is Jasper. Pickens County is part of the Atlanta-Sandy Springs-Roswell, Georgia metropolitan statistical area.

History
The Georgia General Assembly passed an act on December 5, 1853, to create Pickens County from portions of Cherokee and Gilmer Counties. Pickens received several more land additions from Cherokee (1869) and Gilmer Counties (1858 and 1863); however, several sections of Pickens County have also been transferred to other counties: Dawson County (1857), Gordon County (1860), and Cherokee County (1870).

Pickens County is named for American Revolutionary War General Andrew Pickens.

During the Civil War, Company D of the 1st Georgia Infantry Battalion of the Union Army was raised in Pickens County.

Most of Pickens County's early industry revolved around marble. Georgia Marble Company is located in Marble Hill near Tate. The Tate elementary school is built out of marble. The marble was also used to make the statue of Abraham Lincoln in the Lincoln Memorial. Most of the marble is white, but it is one of the few places in the world where pink marble is found. The marble is also used for tombstones for the United States military.

Pickens County has seen very rapid growth with the building of Georgia State Route 515, locally referred to as the "four-lane". Many new businesses and residents continue to move to Pickens County.

Pickens County is home the Georgia Marble Festival.

Geography

The county is located in the Blue Ridge Mountains. The highest point in Pickens County is the 3,288-ft summit of Mount Oglethorpe, the southernmost peak in the Blue Ridge Mountains, and for a number of years, the southern terminus of the Appalachian Trail. Other notable peaks in Pickens County include Sharp Top Mountain and Sharp Mountain. One of the best viewpoints of Sharp Top Mountain is from Grandview Lake Dam on Grandview Road.

The eastern half of Pickens County is located in the Etowah River subbasin of the ACT River Basin (Coosa-Tallapoosa River Basin).  The western half of the county is located in the Coosawattee River sub-basin of the same larger ACT River Basin.

Adjacent counties
 Gilmer County - north
 Dawson County - east
 Cherokee County - south
 Bartow County - southwest
 Gordon County - west

County government 
The government of Pickens County consists of a board of commissioners. Kris Stancil is the board's chairman while Josh Tatum represents the county's east end and Josh Tippens represents the county's west end.

Presidential election results 
Politically, Pickens County is an outlier in Georgia, one of the few ancestrally Republican areas of the state, due to pro-Union sentiment in the county during the Civil War.

Transportation

Major highways

  Interstate 575
  State Route 5
  State Route 53
  State Route 53 Business
  State Route 108
  State Route 136
  State Route 136 Connector
  State Route 372
  State Route 417 (unsigned designation for I-575)
  State Route 515

Demographics

2000 census
As of the census of 2000,  22,983 people, 8,960 households, and 6,791 families lived in the county. The10,687 housing units averaged 46 per square mile (18/km2). The racial makeup of the county was 96.21% White, 1.27% African American, 0.38% Native American, 0.23% Asian, 0.03% Pacific Islander, 1.04% from other races, and 0.84% from two or more races. About 2.03% of the population were Hispanics or Latinos of any race.

Of the 8,960 households, 31.10% had children under the age of 18 living with them, 63.50% were married couples living together, 8.80% had a female householder with no husband present, and 24.20% were not families. About20.50% of all households were made up of individuals, and 7.70% had someone living alone who was 65 years of age or older.  The average household size was 2.54 and the average family size was 2.91.

In the county, the population was distributed as 23.60% under the age of 18, 7.70% from 18 to 24, 29.80% from 25 to 44, 25.80% from 45 to 64, and 13.20% who were 65 years of age or older.  The median age was 38 years. For every 100 females, there were 95.80 males.  For every 100 females age 18 and over, there were 94.20 males.

The median income for a household in the county was $41,387, and for a family was $47,123. Males had a median income of $32,039 versus $22,866 for females. The per capita income for the county was $19,774.  About 6.20% of families and 9.20% of the population were below the poverty line, including 13.20% of those under age 18 and 7.40% of those age 65 or over.

2010 census
As of the 2010 United States Census,  29,431 people, 11,291 households, and 8,423 families resided in the county. The 13,692 housing units averaged . The racial makeup of the county was 95.7% White, 1.1% African American, 0.4% Asian, 0.3% American Indian, 1.3% from other races, and 1.2% from two or more races. Those of Hispanic or Latino origin made up 2.8% of the population. In terms of ancestry, 17.8% were American, 13.2% were English, 12.3% were Irish, and 10.0% were German.

Of the 11,291 households, 32.1% had children under the age of 18 living with them, 60.7% were married couples living together, 9.9% had a female householder with no husband present, 25.4% were not families, and 21.2% of all households were made up of individuals. The average household size was 2.57 and the average family size was 2.97. The median age was 42.1 years.

The median income for a household in the county was $49,945 and for a family was $59,955. Males had a median income of $46,773 versus $34,394 for females. The per capita income for the county was $25,892. About 8.9% of families and 11.6% of the population were below the poverty line, including 15.9% of those under age 18 and 11.4% of those age 65 or over.

2020 census

As of the 2020 United States census, there were 33,216 people, 11,868 households, and 8,539 families residing in the county.

Communities

Cities
 Jasper
 Nelson (partially in Cherokee County)
 Talking Rock

Unincorporated communities
 Tate
 Marble Hill
 Blaine

Private communities
A significant portion of the county population resides in gated master-planned communities that function similar to a municipality, with HOA fees to provide many municipal-type services independently from the county government.

 Bent Tree
 Big Canoe (partially in Dawson County)
 The Preserve at Sharp Mountain

Notable residents 
 Farish Carter Tate, U.S. congressman
 John Bozeman, frontiersman; co-founder of Bozeman, Montana

See also

 National Register of Historic Places listings in Pickens County, Georgia
List of counties in Georgia

References
General

Specific
The weekly newspaper for Pickens County is the Pickens Progress, a family-owned newspaper published since 1887 in Jasper.
 Encyclopedia of Georgia Pickens County article
 GeorgiaInfo Pickens County Courthouse info

External links

 Documents from Pickens County in the Digital Library of Georgia

 
Georgia (U.S. state) counties
Pickens
Northeast Georgia
Counties of Appalachia
1853 establishments in Georgia (U.S. state)
Populated places established in 1853